Michelle Gibson (born February 25, 1969) is an American equestrian. She won a bronze medal in team  dressage at the 1996 Summer Olympics in Atlanta, together with Robert Dover, Steffen Peters and Guenter Seidel. She placed fifth in individual dressage at the 1996 Summer Olympics.

References

1969 births
Living people
American female equestrians
Olympic bronze medalists for the United States in equestrian
Equestrians at the 1996 Summer Olympics
Medalists at the 1996 Summer Olympics
21st-century American women
20th-century American women